= Roman Court =

Roman court can refer to either:

- the court of the secular ruler in Rome, notably the Roman Emperor
- the Roman Curia, the ecclesiastical court of the Pope of Rome
